Argyrodite is an uncommon silver germanium sulfide mineral with formula Ag8GeS6. The color is iron-black with a purplish tinge, and the luster metallic.

Discovered by Clemens Winkler in 1886, it is of interest as it was described shortly after the element germanium was isolated, 15 years after it had been postulated by Mendeleev.  It was first described for an occurrence in the Himmelsfürst Mine, Erzgebirge, Freiberg, Saxony, Germany.

The Freiberg mineral had previously been imperfectly described by August Breithaupt under the name "Plusinglanz", and Bolivian crystals were incorrectly described in 1849 as crystallized brongniardite.

Isomorphous with argyrodite is the corresponding tin bearing mineral Ag8SnS6, also found in Bolivia as pseudocubic crystals, and known by the name canfieldite. There is also a related mineral, putzite, with composition (Cu4.7Ag3.3)GeS6.

Argyrodite gets its name from the Greek words that loosely translate into "rich in silver".

Argyrodite-type material 
The term argyrodite is also used for other materials with a similar crystal structure, in particular lithium based argyrodite-type materials, which have received interest from researchers as a potential solid-state electrolyte for lithium-ion batteries.

They are considered to be of the form:

With x between 0 and 1, B denoting either phosphor or arsenic, Ch for sulfur or selenium and X for chlorine, bromine or iodine.

References 

Attribution:

Silver minerals
Sulfide minerals
Germanium minerals
Orthorhombic minerals
Minerals in space group 33